Iglesia de San Pedro is the Spanish name for Saint Peter Church (formerly San Pablo Church) located in Lima, Peru. The church was completed in 1638. 

It is administered by the Jesuits and it was created Basilica as part of the Archdiocese of Lima.

The church is part of the Historic Centre of Lima, which was added to the UNESCO World Heritage List in 1991.

In this church, Sacred Heart of Jesus is venerated.

Among those interred within the church is the Viceroy of Peru (1796-1801) Ambrosio O'Higgins.

On 16 March 2018 the basilica hosted the royal wedding of Prince Christian of Hanover to Alessandra de Osma.

See also 
List of buildings in Lima
 Historic Centre of Lima
 Francis Borgia

References 

 Vargas Ugarte, Rubén: Los jesuitas y el arte, Lima, 1963. 
 Anónimo: El Tesoro de San Pedro. Colección de cuerpos y reliquias de Santos y Mártires, Lima, 1907. 

Roman Catholic churches completed in 1638
Tourist attractions in Lima
Colonial Peru
Basilica churches in Peru
Roman Catholic churches in Lima
Ossuaries
Spanish Colonial architecture in Peru
16th-century establishments in the Spanish Empire
17th-century Roman Catholic church buildings in Peru
Neoclassical church buildings in Peru